The 1931–32 season is FC Barcelona's 33rd in existence, and was their 4th year in the Primera División. It covers the period from 1931-08-01 to 1932-07-31.

FC Barcelona won the Catalan league for the 18th time, the 3rd in a row, their only title in the season.

First-team squad

Transfers

In

Out

Competitions

La Liga

League table

Results by round

Matches

Copa del Rey

Round of 16

Quarterfinals

Semifinals

Final

Catalan football championship

League table

Matches

Friendlies

Results

References
BDFutbol
Webdelcule.com

FC Barcelona seasons
Barcelona